Villa Las Estrellas is a Chilean town and research station on King George Island within the Chilean Antarctic claim, the Chilean Antarctic Territory, and also within the Argentine and British Antarctic claims.

The Chilean government considers it to be in the commune of Antártica, in the province of Antártica Chilena, in the región of Magallanes and Chilean Antartica.

It is located on President Eduardo Frei Montalva Base, a research station. It is the larger one of only two civilian settlements on Antarctica (the other being Argentina's Esperanza Base). It has a summer population of 150 and a winter population of 80.

Government
The Office of the Civil Service Registry and Identification of Chile acts as official registry office with all the responsibilities inherent in this position.

There is a Correos de Chile post office staffed in the summer by a postal worker and by the command of the base in the winter. The office receives all its mail from Punta Arenas and is the mail depot and relay station for all mail addressed to any Chilean installation on Antarctica in addition to some other foreign facilities. From here it is delivered by hand, plane, or helicopter. The post office is also an attraction for tourists and philately enthusiasts that travel to the town to send postcards and letters with an Antarctic postmark.

The town is in the Piloto Pardo census district.

Community
The people of Villa Las Estrellas live in a community that has fourteen 90 m² (970 sq. ft.) homes. Juan Pablo Camacho, the first Chilean born in the Antarctic region, was born at Villa Las Estrellas in 1984.

Education
The populace's youth study at F-50 "Villa Las Estrellas" School, a 1st–8th grade primary school staffed by two teachers that are responsible for providing education for the community's approximately 15 children.  Library No. 291 has a collection of books and magazines that are available upon request.

Healthcare
There is a Chilean Air Force Hospital staffed with one doctor and nurse and equipped with: X-ray, laboratory, surgery, anesthesia machine, sterilizer, and pharmacy services in addition to limited emergency and surgery capabilities. Two hospital beds are available in addition to a dental clinic. Through a partnership with the Chilean Antarctic Institute and the University of Chile, in emergencies, medical images can be outsourced to specialized health centers in South America and Europe for diagnosis.

 all residents, including children, are required to have their appendixes removed before coming to Villa Las Estrellas as a safety precaution as healthcare services are limited.

Business and recreation
A branch of the Bank of Credit and Investment operates throughout the year staffed by a sole banker. Santa María Reina de la Paz (St. Mary Queen of Peace) is a Catholic chapel that attracts people from all over King George Island.

 Hostel: There is a small hostel capable of holding a maximum occupancy of 20 guests.
 Souvenir shop: There is a small souvenir shop in town to sell to tourists and staff returning to the continent. It is run by the women of the town.
 Gymnasium: Is the main community hub, in which a lot of activity takes place. Tennis practice, babyfútbol, basketball and volleyball.  There are exercise machines, ping pong tables, dressing rooms and sauna. It is also used for cultural activities and scientific talks.

Communication
 Telephones: Telephones for the base and their airfield operate via satellite telephone and, for the inhabitants of the sector, there is a coin-operated pay phone and prepaid cards.
 Internet: There are three computers at the school that have internet access.
 Radio: FM Radio "Sovereignty" broadcast on the frequency of 90.5 MHz works during the day, providing music and information to all the bases in the sector. Certain cultural and entertainment programs made by staff and their families are also disseminated.
 Television: The town has a fixed dish of 2.5 meters in diameter, which allows reception of live signals from the main television channels in the country, broadcasting from Santiago. Residents can also receive two broadcast stations. These are Televisión Nacional and Universidad Católica Television.
 Mobile phone: Since 2005, there is an antenna belonging to the Chilean company Entel PCS.

Transportation
The nearest airport is the Teniente R. Marsh Airport, the only airport in Antarctica that has an IATA code. There is no regular scheduled public service to the airport, although Aerovías DAP has some charter flights from Punta Arenas.

Climate 
Villa Las Estrellas has a marine polar climate (Köppen ET) in which winter temperatures are much milder than in many well-populated wintry areas such as in Canada and Siberia. Summer temperatures however are extremely subdued; in effect narrowly above freezing, causing the climate to be hostile to human population. Sunshine levels are also extremely low.

See also
 List of Antarctic research stations
 List of Antarctic field camps
Puerto Toro
Puerto Williams
Chilean Antarctic Territory
Antártica Chilena Province
Antártica (Commune)

References

External links 
Details of the expeditions in Antarctica

Outposts of Antarctica
Populated places established in 1984
Chilean Antarctic Territory
Argentine Antarctica
British Antarctic Territory
1984 establishments in Antarctica
1984 establishments in Chile